Reginald William Winchester Wilmot (21 June 1911 – 10 January 1954) was an Australian war correspondent who reported for the BBC and the ABC during the Second World War. After the war he continued to work as a broadcast reporter, and wrote a well-appreciated book about the liberation of Europe. He was killed in the crash of a BOAC Comet (Yoke Peter) over the Mediterranean Sea.

Early life
Wilmot was born in Brighton, a suburb of Melbourne; he was the son of Reginald Wilmot, a sports journalist, and grandson of surveyor JGW Wilmot. He attended Melbourne Grammar School and then studied history, politics and law under Sir Ernest Scott at the University of Melbourne, where he resided at Trinity College and became interested in debating; after he graduated in 1936, he went on an international debating tour. One of the stops was in Nazi Germany where he went to a Nuremberg Rally. Wilmot began to work as a legal clerk in 1939.

War reporter
After working as a law clerk for only a few months, the outbreak of the Second World War led Wilmot to join the Australian Broadcasting Corporation. He was sent to the Middle East in 1940 and reported from North Africa, Greece and Syria; he was in Tobruk during the siege of 1941. When Japan entered the war, Wilmot returned to Australia, then went out to cover the war in the Pacific. He reported from Papua during the Japanese invasion in 1942, including the Kokoda Track campaign, where he walked up to the forward area, around Abuari and Isurava, with fellow war correspondent Osmar White and cinematographer Damien Parer. Wilmot regarded General Sir Thomas Blamey as incompetent and protested at his sacking of Lieutenant General Sydney Rowell.

Blamey cancelled Wilmot's accreditation as a war correspondent in October 1942 for spreading a false rumour that Blamey was taking payments from the laundry contractor at Puckapunyal. Wilmot was reinstated, but on 1 November 1942, Blamey again terminated Wilmot's accreditation, this time for good.

BBC work
There Wilmot wrote a book about his experiences in Tobruk, and narrated a documentary film called Sons of the ANZACs. In 1944 Wilmot transferred to the BBC where he was one of the principal reporters for D-Day, flying in a glider with the 6th Airborne Division. He was present at and reported from the field for most of the actions during the liberation of Europe. When the German high command surrendered, Wilmot was present to report on it.

Military historian
After the end of the war Wilmot remained in England, where he wrote articles on the recent war as well as a book about World War II, The Struggle for Europe.  When it appeared in 1952, the book was favourably reviewed, and it is well regarded by military historians (John Keegan wrote, "Wilmot effectively invented the modern method of writing contemporary military history").  One of his articles criticizing the Allied plan to occupy Germany appeared in Life magazine.

Wilmot intended to write a volume on the Siege of Tobruk and Battle of El Alamein for the Australian official history of the war, but was killed in the Comet crash; see Australia in the War of 1939–1945.

Broadcaster

Wilmot was part of the television commentary team for the coronation of Queen Elizabeth II. For Christmas 1953, Wilmot was sent by the BBC to Australia to participate in a round-the-world broadcast on Christmas Day, where he narrated The Queen's Journey, telling the story of recent royal visits. The Queen herself was in New Zealand for Christmas.

Death
Wilmot was en route back to Britain from that assignment on BOAC Flight 781 when his plane, a Comet 1, broke up following explosive decompression over the Mediterranean Sea; all aboard were killed. He had first boarded the flight in Rangoon.

Books
Tobruk 1941, Capture - Siege - Relief, Angus & Robertson Ltd, 1945.
The Struggle For Europe (written in part by Christopher Daniel McDevitt), 1952. Reissue:  Wordsworth Editions Ltd, Ware, Hertfordshire, 1997. .

Notes

References

Australian Dictionary of National Biography
Biography at the Australian War Memorial
Obituary, The Times, 13 January 1954.

Further reading
 

1911 births
1954 deaths
People educated at Trinity College (University of Melbourne)
Australian military historians
Victims of aviation accidents or incidents in Italy
Journalists from Melbourne
Australian expatriates in the United Kingdom
Australian war correspondents
20th-century Australian historians
Victims of aviation accidents or incidents in 1954
People from Brighton, Victoria